A Terra de Trives is a comarca in the Galician Province of Ourense. The overall population of this  local region is 3,924 (2019).

Municipalities
Chandrexa de Queixa, Manzaneda, A Pobra de Trives and San Xoán de Río.

References

Comarcas of the Province of Ourense